Keerthilatha Premawathie Abeywickrama was a Sri Lankan politician and a Member of the Parliament of Sri Lanka.
Abeywickrama was the daughter of Padikara Muhandiram Don Pedris Francis Abeywickrama and Catharina Liyanage from Morawaka, Sri Lanka. She joined the United National Party and was appointed as a Member of Parliament for the Deniyaya Electoral District on 11 September 1987 after her brother Keerthisena was killed in the 1987 grenade attack in the Sri Lankan Parliament. She was the cousin of Sumanadasa Abeywickrama Deputy Minister of Agriculture Development & Research and Member of Parliament for Akmeemana.

See also 
 List of political families in Sri Lanka
 Abeywickrama
 List of United National Party MPs

References 

Members of the 8th Parliament of Sri Lanka
Sinhalese politicians
Sri Lankan Buddhists
United National Party politicians
Women legislators in Sri Lanka
Possibly living people
Year of birth missing